Jurong is a county-level city under the administration of Zhenjiang, Jiangsu province, China.

In 129 BC, the then Prince of Changsha Liu Fa's son, Dang became the Marquis of Jurong. As he died soon, the lands enfeoffed to him became Jurong county in the next year. Jurong was under the jurisdiction of Nanjing historically, but it was annexed to the Prefecture of Zhenjiang in 1950, then Zhenjiang in 1983. The county was converted into a county-level city in 1995.

Administrative divisions
In the present, Jurong City has 5 towns and 1 other.
5 towns

1 other
 Jurong Economic Development Zone

Climate

Transport

Nanjing Metro
Several stations of Line S6 of Nanjing Metro, also known as "Nanjing–Jurong Intercity Metro" is located in Jurong. The metro line opened in December 2021.

China Railway
 on the Nanjing–Hangzhou high-speed railway is situated in the southwest outskirts of the city.

Jurong railway station on the South Jiangsu Riverside high-speed railway is under construction and will open in 2023.

See also 
 Jurong air force base

References

External links
Jurong City English Guide (Jiangsu.NET)

Cities in Jiangsu
County-level divisions of Jiangsu
Zhenjiang